David Appel is a Czech professional ice hockey player in Slovakia with MHC Martin of the Slovak Extraliga.

References

External links

Living people
MHC Martin players
Year of birth missing (living people)
Czech ice hockey forwards
Czech expatriate ice hockey players in Germany
Czech expatriate ice hockey players in Slovakia